The Nathan and Susannah Harris House is a historic home located at Harrisville, Cecil County, Maryland, United States. It is a large two stories high, four bays wide by two rooms deep, stone dwelling constructed in 1798. The house is representative of the expansion during the 18th century of the Quaker community called the Nottingham Lots.

The Nathan and Susannah Harris House was listed on the National Register of Historic Places in 1984.

References

External links
, including photo from 1995, Maryland Historical Trust

Houses on the National Register of Historic Places in Maryland
Houses in Cecil County, Maryland
Houses completed in 1798
Quakerism in Maryland
National Register of Historic Places in Cecil County, Maryland